Shahrdari Lahijan Football Club is an Iranian football club based in Lahijan, Iran. They competed in the 2010–11 Iran Football's 3rd Division.

Season-by-Season

The table below shows the achievements of the club in various competitions.

See also
Hazfi Cup
Iran Football's 3rd Division 2010–11

Football clubs in Iran
Association football clubs established in 2003
2003 establishments in Iran